"We Built This City" is a 1985 song by American rock band Starship, the debut single from the album Knee Deep in the Hoopla. It was written by English musicians Martin Page and Bernie Taupin, who were both living in Los Angeles at the time, and was originally intended as a lament against the closure of many of that city's live music clubs.

The song peaked at number one on the Billboard Hot 100. Outside the United States, "We Built This City" topped the charts in Australia and Canada, peaked inside the top 10 of the charts in Germany, the Republic of Ireland, Sweden and Switzerland, the top 20 on the charts in Belgium, New Zealand and the United Kingdom and the top 30 of the charts in Austria and the Netherlands.

The song has gained significant scorn, both for the seeming inscrutability of its lyrics (notably the line "Marconi plays the mamba"), and for the contrast between the song's anti-corporate message and its polished, "corporate rock" sound. It topped a 2011 Rolling Stone poll of worst songs of the 1980s by a wide margin, and the magazines Blender and GQ both called it the worst song of all time.

Content
Song cowriters Martin Page and Bernie Taupin have stated that the song is about the decline of live-performance clubs in Los Angeles during the 1980s. The lyrics are structured as a plea to corporate interests who are shutting down rock music clubs ("We just want to dance here/ Someone stole the stage") because the corporations are concerned only with profits and respectability ("Too many runaways"), and have forgotten that rock music was what first brought people to the city ("Don't you remember? We built this city on rock and roll!").

Though the song was originally written about Los Angeles, the Starship rendition references San Francisco (the hometown of both Starship and its predecessors, Jefferson Airplane and Jefferson Starship) with a spoken-word interlude in which a radio DJ states, "I'm looking out over that Golden Gate Bridge". However, the DJ then says, "Here's your favorite radio station in your favorite radio city, the city by the bay, the city that rocks, the city that never sleeps", stressing the universality of the message: while "the city by the bay" is a nickname for San Francisco, the other two phrases are not, and "The City That Never Sleeps" is a well-known nickname for New York City. Capitalizing on the ambiguity, several radio stations added descriptions of their own local areas when they broadcast the song or added their own ident in its place.

The album's title, Knee Deep in the Hoopla, is taken from a lyric in the first verse of this song.

Production
The song was engineered by producer Bill Bottrell, written by Bernie Taupin, Martin Page, Dennis Lambert and Peter Wolf and arranged by Bottrell and Jasun Martz. The song was based on a demo by Page and Taupin with a darker feel and based on how clubs were dying in Los Angeles, leaving live performers without work. Wolf reworked the song's arrangement with a more upbeat tone.

The song features Mickey Thomas and Grace Slick sharing lead vocals. MTV executive and former DJ Les Garland provided the DJ voiceover during the song's bridge. Additionally, some radio stations, with the help of jingle company JAM Creative Productions, inserted their own opening lines to promote their stations.

Reception

Billboard said that this "unusual rock 'n' roll anthem is as wise as it is rebellious."  Cash Box called it "an ear-catching tune" and described it as "dance rock with sharp hooks."

"We Built This City" received a Grammy Award nomination for Best Rock Vocal Performance by a Duo or Group in 1986.

Blender magazine's 50 Most Awesomely Bad Songs Ever
In 2004, the magazine Blender ran a feature on "The 50 Worst Songs Ever", in conjunction with the VH1 Special The 50 Most Awesomely Bad Songs...Ever. To qualify, songs had to be well-known hits; the list also avoided novelty songs, and multiple songs by the same artist. "We Buit This City" came in at #1. According to Blender editor Craig Marks, the choice was nearly unanimous among those who had been polled. Marks said of the song, "It purports to be anti-commercial but reeks of '80s corporate-rock commercialism. It's a real reflection of what practically killed rock music in the '80s." He referred to the line of the song "Marconi plays the mamba", asking, "Who is Marconi? And what is the mamba? The mamba is the deadliest snake in the world, so he must have meant the mambo, but it sounds so much like 'mamba' that every lyric website writes it that way. It makes sense neither way." The Blender feature also noted the irony of the song lamenting "they're always changing corporation names", given Starship's own frequent name changes.

Asked about the listing, Mickey Thomas, one of the singers of Starship, said he was surprised at the ranking, but also "thrilled" because of the other high-profile groups on the list, saying, "I wish Blender had called us for a group shot. I'd love to have my picture taken with Stevie Wonder and Paul McCartney." (Wonder and McCartney were listed together at #10 for their 1982 duet "Ebony and Ivory".) Asked again about the listing in 2010, Thomas said: "From what I heard, they got so much flak about it that they sort of retracted their statements in a way about the song. And not only that, but Blenders folded, and we're still here."

Richmond Times-Dispatch music critic Melissa Ruggieri argued that "Nothing's Gonna Stop Us Now" and "Sara" were Starship songs that were more suitable for the top of the list than "We Built This City", a song Ruggieri said "references Marconi, the father of the radio...inserted a cool snippet of DJ chatter from the band's beloved San Francisco...[and] found Grace Slick enunciating the phrase 'corporation games' with nutty abandon."

Rolling Stone Top Ten Worst Songs of the 1980s
In 2011, a Rolling Stone magazine online readers poll named "We Built This City" the worst song of the 1980s. The song's winning margin was so large that the magazine reported it "could be the biggest blow-out victory in the history of the Rolling Stone Readers Poll".

GQ Worst Song of All Time
In August 2016, GQ magazine declared this song as the worst of all time, referring to it as "the most detested song in human history". The article covered Bernie Taupin and Martin Page's roles in writing an early version of the song, the song's development into its final version, its massive success and backlash, and Grace Slick's inconsistent statements about whether she liked the song.

Personnel 

 Mickey Thomas – lead and backing vocals
 Grace Slick – lead and backing vocals
 Craig Chaquico – lead and rhythm guitar
 Pete Sears – bass guitar
 Donny Baldwin – electronic drums, backing vocals

Additional personnel

 Peter Wolf – keyboards, synthesizers
 Les Garland – DJ voice

Charts

Weekly charts

Year-end charts

All-time charts

Certifications

LadBaby version

In December 2018, British blogger LadBaby released a comedy version of the song with a sausage roll theme (the refrain being "We Built This City on Sausage Rolls") as a charity single whose profits went to The Trussell Trust. It debuted at number one on the UK Singles Chart, beating Ava Max's "Sweet but Psycho" and Ariana Grande's "Thank U, Next" to the 2018 Christmas number one.

See also
List of music considered the worst

References

External links

1985 debut singles
1985 songs
2018 singles
Billboard Hot 100 number-one singles
Cashbox number-one singles
Charity singles
Christmas number-one singles in the United Kingdom
Number-one singles in Australia
Number-one singles in South Africa
RCA Records singles
RPM Top Singles number-one singles
Songs about radio
Songs about San Francisco
Songs with lyrics by Bernie Taupin
Songs written by Dennis Lambert
Songs written by Martin Page
Songs written by Peter Wolf (producer)
Starship (band) songs
UK Singles Chart number-one singles